Coldrick is a surname. Notable people with the surname include:

 David Coldrick, Gaelic football referee
 Graham Coldrick (born 1945), Welsh footballer
 Percy Coldrick (1888–1953), Welsh rugby player
 William Coldrick (1894–1975), British politician

See also
 Goldrick